Melike Bakırcıoğlu (born February 24, 1987 in İstanbul, Turkey) is a Turkish female basketball player. She plays for Fenerbahçe İstanbul as forward position. She is 190 cm tall and weighs 79 kg. She is playing for Beşiktaş Cola Turka and also played for Fenerbahçe İstanbul between 2005-2010 Turkey national women's basketball team.

Bakırcıoğlu is the designated double teaming player on defense.

Honors
Turkish Championship
Winners (3): 2006, 2007, 2009 with Fenerbahçe Istanbul
Turkish Cup
Winners (3): 2006, 2007, 2009 with Fenerbahçe Istanbul
Turkish Presidents Cup
Winners (2): 2007, 2009 with Fenerbahçe Istanbul

See also
 Turkish women in sports

External links
Player profile at fenerbahce.org

1987 births
Living people
Beşiktaş women's basketball players
Fenerbahçe women's basketball players
Turkish women's basketball players
Basketball players from Istanbul